Asgog Loch is a natural freshwater loch in Argyll and Bute, Scotland. The loch was dammed during the 19th century to create an impounding reservoir for the supply of freshwater to the Low Mills of the nearby gunpowder mills at Millhouse (the Kames Powder Works).

The remains of three crannogs, or artificial islands, have been observed within the loch on occasions when the water level has been lowered.

Asgog Castle, situated on the northwest shore of the loch, was once the home of a cadet branch of Clan Lamont. It was first recorded in 1581, but may be mid-15th-century in date. In 1646, the castle was besieged and eventually destroyed by Clan Campbell, during the conflict now known as the Dunoon massacre. Only three walls of the keep are now standing; of the courtyard, there are no identifiable remains.

See also

 List of lochs in Scotland
 List of reservoirs and dams in the United Kingdom

Sources

External links

Reservoirs in Argyll and Bute
Cowal